Welcome to the Wayne is an animated television series created by Billy Lopez. It premiered on July 24, 2017 on Nickelodeon. Welcome to the Wayne originated as an online web series, that was originally released on Nick.com from November 14 to December 26, 2014.

On October 15, 2018, the show moved to the sister network Nicktoons.

During the course of the series, 30 episodes of Welcome to the Wayne aired over two seasons.

Series overview

Episodes

Web series (2014)

Season 1 (2017–18)

Season 2 (2019)

Notes

References

Lists of American children's animated television series episodes
Lists of Canadian children's animated television series episodes
Lists of Nickelodeon television series episodes